Joseph Bradford (born October 10, 1989) is an American professional "New/Current School" Bicycle Motocross (BMX) racer whose prime competitive years are from 1999 to the present. His nickname is simply "Joey".

BMX racing career milestones

Note: Professional first are on the national level unless otherwise indicated.

*In the NBL "B" Pro/Super Class/"A" Pro/Junior Elite Men depending on the era; in the ABA it is "A" Pro.
**In the NBL it is "AA" Pro/Elite Men; in the ABA it is "AA" Pro.

Career factory and major bike shop sponsors

Note: This listing only denotes the racer's primary sponsors. At any given time a racer could have numerous ever changing co-sponsors. Primary sponsorships can be verified by BMX press coverage and sponsor's advertisements at the time in question. When possible exact dates are given.

Amateur/Junior Men
Haynes BMX: 1999
No Fear Racing:  -April 1999
Kovachi Wheels:April 1999 – 2000
Fox/Specialized/Mountain Dew: 2000-2001
Staats Bicycles: 2002-December 2003
Avent/Bomshell: December 2003-December 2004
Hyundai/Mongoose: January 2005-Mid December 2005
GT (Gary Turner) Bicycles: December 20, 2005–Present. Joey would turn pro with this sponsor.

Professional/Elite Men
GT (Gary Turner) Bicycles: December 20, 2005–Present.

Career bicycle motocross titles

Note: Listed are District, State/Provincial/Department, Regional, National, and International titles in italics. Depending on point totals of individual racers, winners of Grand Nationals do not necessarily win National titles. Only sanctioning bodies active during the racer's career are listed. Series and one off Championships are also listed in block.

Amateur/Junior Men
National Bicycle League (NBL)
1998 8 Expert National No.1
1999 9 Expert & 9-10 Cruiser National No.1
1998,'99,'00 California State Champion
1998,'99,'00 Western-Regional Champion
1998 8 Expert President's Cup Champion
2002 12 Expert and 12 Cruiser Grandnational Champion
2002 12 Expert and 12 Cruiser National No.1
2003 13 Expert and 13 Cruiser Grandnational Champion
2003 13 Expert & 13-14 Cruiser National No.1
2004 14 Expert Grandnational Champion.
2004 14 Expert National No.1
2005 15 Expert National No.1
2006 16 Expert National No.1
American Bicycle Association (ABA)
1998 8 Expert Gold Cup West Champion
1998,'99,'00,'01,'02,'03 California State Champion
1998 10 Expert Redline Gold Cup Champion
1999 10 Expert & 10 Cruiser Race of Champions Champion
2000 12 Expert & 12 Cruiser Redline Gold Cup Champion
2001 11 Expert World Champion
2001 12 Expert & 12 Cruiser Race of Champions champion
2002 12 Expert & 12 Cruiser World Champion
2002 13 Expert & 13 Cruiser Race of Champions champion
2003 14 Expert & 14 Cruiser Race of Champions (ROC) champion
2004 14 Expert & 14 Cruiser World Champion
2004 15 Expert & 15 Cruiser Redline Gold Cup Champion
2005 15 Expert & 15 Cruiser World Champion
2005 16 Expert & 16 Cruiser Redline Gold Cup Champion
2005 16 Expert National Age Group (NAG) No.1
2006 17 Expert Redline Gold Cup Cruiser Champion
Union Cycliste Internationale (UCI)
2000 11 Boys World Champion
2002 12 Boys World Champion
2003 13 Boys & 13-14 Cruiser World Champion
2005 15 Boys & 15-16 Cruiser World Champion
2003 14-16 Pacific Oceanic Champion
2005 14–16 Boys Pan Pacific Champion
2006 14–16 boys Pan Pacific Champion
2006 North American Junior Men Champion
2007 Junior Men's Silver Medal World Champion
USA Cycling BMX
2007 Junior Cruiser National Champion

Professional/Elite Men
National Bicycle League (NBL)

American Bicycle Association (ABA)

Union Cycliste Internationale (UCI)*

USA Cycling

BMX South Africa (BMXSA)
2007 Elite Men South African National Champion

Pro Series Championships

BMX product lines
2006 Fly Joey Bradford Signature Series Bars.
Product evaluation:

Notable accolades

Significant injuries
Dislocated shoulder in a crash during the main at the 2006 UCI World Championships in the Netherlands.
Suffered a bad muscle bruise injury in his left lower back falling coming out of the first turn in the first moto at the ABA Winternationals in Phoenix, Arizona on March 25, 2007.

Racing habits and traits

Miscellaneous
In early 2007 when Bradford was still just 17 years old he started the "Joey Bradford Disability Fund" to aid financially seriously injured and/or financially troubled BMX racers. BMX despite being an Olympic sport and gaining world respect, is still not truly a professional sport in which a racer could become financially independent. Sponsors provide professional racers their salaries as well as providing them with free travel, expenses, entrance fees for racers, and free bicycle parts as well as payment for appearing in advertisements. If he or she is let go by a sponsor, that racer would often be in financial straits. With no salary, free travel or other expenses paid. He would solely rely on race winnings to support his racing, which would be of course, partly offset by the entrance fees he would have to pay for out of pocket including travel cost. The financial pressures are even greater if the racer is married with children with a mortgage and car payments. As a result, a racer could find him/herself in dire straits if he is injured, particularly if it is a career ending one. There is no pensions for BMXers as there are in major long established sports like baseball football basketball etc.
To aid racers who have fallen on financially hard times Bradford along with veterans of the sport founded the fund. As described at the fatbmx.com website:

BMX and general press magazine interviews and articles
"Background Check: Joey Bradford" Transworld BMX July 2004 Vol.11 Iss.7 No.93 pg.86

BMX magazine covers

Note: Only magazines that were in publication at the time of the racer's career(s) are listed unless specifically noted.

BMX Plus!:

Snap BMX Magazine & Transworld BMX:
None
Twenty BMX:

Moto Mag:
None
BMX World (2005–Present):

Bicycles Today & BMX Today (The official NBL publication under two names):

ABA Action, American BMXer, BMXer (The official ABA publication under three names):

Post BMX Career

Still active. However, in 2003 he started a simultaneous Mountain Bike Racing career, one of the few BMXers to do so at his stage in his career which was only six years into his BMX amateur career. Most BMXers who cross over to MTB racing do so after his BMX career or in its last few years. John Tomac, Tinker Juarez started MTB racing after their BMX careers. Pete Loncarevich, Eric Carter, Bas de Bever, Corine Dorland and Dale Holmes started their MTB careers during the one or two twilight years of BMX racing. Among the exceptions is Wade Bootes that started MTB racing essentially during the middle of his BMX career. It is difficult for a  racer to train effectively at the championship level for either of the two disciplines although skills for one easily translate to the other, still the training regimen for one is different enough to adversely affect the other. As a result, most start the crossover just about at the end of their usually long BMX racing careers.

Mountain Bike career

Started racing: 2003

Sub Discipline: 4 Cross Downhil

Career MTB factory and major Non-factory sponsors

Note: This listing only denotes the racer's primary sponsors. At any given time a racer could have numerous co-sponsors. Primary sponsorships can be verified by MTB press coverage and sponsor's advertisements at the time in question. When possible exact dates are given.

Amateur
Staats Bicycles: 2002-2003
Avent/Bomshell: 2003-2004
Hyundai/Mongoose: January 2005-Mid December 2005
GT (Gary Turner) Bicycles: December 20, 2005–Present. Joey would turn pro with this sponsor.

Career Mountain Bike Racing (MTB) titles

Note: Listed are Regional, National and International titles.

Amateur
2003,'04,'05,'06 Sea Otter Classic 4cross Champion

Professional
 Union Cycliste Internationale (UCI)
 National Off Road Bicycle Association (NORBA)
 USA Cycling

References

External links
 
 

1989 births
Living people
BMX riders
American male cyclists